Gogii Games is a Canadian video game developer and publisher headquartered in Moncton, New Brunswick, Canada.

Games
The company makes primarily Hidden Object / Adventure games, targeted to adult females. Gogii's catalog of games consists of more than 30 games - including original franchises such as Escape the Museum and Princess Isabella: A Witch’s Curse, as well as licensed products based on Archie Comics and Shannon Tweed.

Their games are primarily developed for PC and Mac, and most have been ported to iOS, Android and other mobile platforms.

Games developed or published by Gogii Games include:
 Archie: Riverdale Rescue
 Shannon Tweed's Attack of the Groupies
 Fairy Tale Mysteries series
 Mirror Mysteries series 
 Princess Isabella series
 Empress of the Deep series, (developed by Silverback Games)
 The Beast of Lycan Isle, (developed by Silverback Games)
 Infected: The Twin Vaccine
 Frat House: The Perfect Score
 White Haven Mysteries
 Haunted Past: Realm of Ghosts
 Voodoo Whisperer: A Curse of a Legend
 Nanny Mania series
 Robin's Quest: A Legend Born
 Secrets of the Dragon Wheel, developed by (Silverback Games)
 Escape the Museum series
 Mr. Jone's Graveyard Shift
 Adventure Chronicles
 "Dark Lore Mysteries: The Hunt for Truth"

Awards
Princess Isabella was declared the 2009 Game of the Year by Big Fish Games, as well as being nominated in four categories at the 2nd Great Game Awards by GameHouse, where it won Top Adventure Game.

References

External links
Official Site

Companies based in Moncton
Video game companies of Canada
Video game development companies